Omagh High School is a secondary school in Omagh, County Tyrone in Northern Ireland. The school is located on the east side of town.

History 
Christos Gaitatzis became the new principal in 2019.

Community 
The school is supported by Friends Of Omagh High School, a charity recognised by the Charity Commission for Northern Ireland.

References 

Omagh
Secondary schools in County Tyrone